Giro della Lunigiana is a four-day road bicycle race for junior men (age 17 and 18) in the historical territory Lunigiana (currently the provinces of La Spezia and Massa Carrara), Italy. The race, class 2.1 MJ on the UCI calendar, counts as a big event in the junior men category. Famous Italian pro riders such as Gilberto Simoni, Danilo Di Luca, Damiano Cunego and Vincenzo Nibali won this race when they were juniors; as did future international stars including Remco Evenepoel and grand tour winners Tao Geoghegan Hart and Tadej Pogačar.

Winners

External links
  

Cycle races in Italy
Recurring sporting events established in 1975
1975 establishments in Italy
Men's road bicycle races